Rika Fujiwara was the defending champion, but chose not to participate.

Zheng Saisai won the title, defeating Monique Adamczak in the final, 7–5, 6–2.

Seeds

Main draw

Finals

Top half

Bottom half

References 
 Main draw

Kurume Best Amenity International Women's Tennis - Singles
Kurume Best Amenity Cup